Jayden Campbell (born 7 February 2000) is an Australian professional rugby league footballer who plays as a  for the Gold Coast Titans in the NRL.

Background
Campbell was born in Cronulla into a family of Indigenous Australian (Nucoorilma) and Danish descent. In 2006, at six years of age, he moved with his family to the Gold Coast when his professional rugby league-playing father, Preston, became the first player to sign with the newly established Gold Coast Titans and was later honoured with the club's first ever Life Membership. The Campbell family also shares a relation with former Queensland captain Greg Inglis who is a cousin of theirs. Jayden played his junior rugby league on the Gold Coast for the Helensvale Hornets and attended Helensvale State High School throughout his upbringing. The Gold Coast Titans signed Campbell to an NRL development contract at 19 years of age. His State of Origin eligibility for Queensland was confirmed in August 2021.

Playing career

Early career
In 2018, Campbell played for the Burleigh Bears in the Mal Meninga Cup, before moving up to their Hastings Deering Colts side later that season.

In 2019, he scored 24 tries in 21 games for the Bears' Colts side and won the club's Best & Fairest award. In 2020, he joined the Titans' NRL squad on a development contract.

2021
Campbell began the 2021 season playing for the Tweed Heads Seagulls in the Queensland Cup.

In Round 13 of the 2021 NRL season, Campbell made his first grade debut for the Gold Coast against the Melbourne Storm.
In round 23, Campbell scored two tries for the Gold Coast in a 34-20 loss against Melbourne.
In round 25, Campbell scored two tries for the Gold Coast in a 44-0 victory over the New Zealand Warriors.

2022
On 9 June, Campbell was ruled out for eight weeks with a high grade hamstring tear during the Gold Coast's loss against North Queensland.
In round 20 of the 2022 NRL season, Campbell scored two tries for the Gold Coast in their 36-24 loss against Canberra which left the club sitting bottom of the table.
Campbell played a total of 14 games for the club in the 2022 season as the club finished 13th on the table.

References

External links
Gold Coast Titans profile

2000 births
Living people
Australian people of Danish descent
Australian rugby league players
Gold Coast Titans players
Indigenous Australian rugby league players
Rugby league fullbacks
Rugby league players from Sydney
Tweed Heads Seagulls players